is a railway station located in Imari, Saga Prefecture, Japan. It is operated by JR Kyushu and is on the Chikuhi Line.

Lines

Station layout 
The station, which is unstaffed, consists of a side platform serving a single track. There is no station building, only a shelter on the platform for waiting passengers. The traces of a disused freight platform can be seen to the north of the platform.

Adjacent stations

History
This station was opened on the same day as an intermediate station on the new track. The Kitakyushu Railway was nationalised on 1 October 1937 and Japanese Government Railways (JGR) assumed control of the station and designated the track which served it as part of the Chikuhi Line. With the privatization of Japanese National Railways (JNR), the successor of JGR, on 1 April 1987, control of the station passed to JR Kyushu.

Passenger statistics
In fiscal 2015, there were a total of 1,686 boarding passengers, giving a daily average of 5 passengers.

Environs
National Route 202
National Route 498
Morinaga Park
Saga Prefectural Imari School for the Handicapped

References

External links
Kami-Imari (JR Kyushu)

Railway stations in Saga Prefecture
Stations of Kyushu Railway Company
Chikuhi Line
Railway stations in Japan opened in 1935